Podhum   is a village in Croatia. It is connected by the D52 highway. During World War II it was the site of the Podhum massacre of Croat civilians by Italian occupation forces; up to 118 people were killed and more than 800 were sent to Italian concentration camps, where many more also died in captivity.

A large Spomenik monument in a park in Podhum now marks the place where Italian forces executed male villagers ranging in age from 16 to 60 years on July 14, 1942. The monument was designed by Croatian sculptor Šime Vulas (1932-2018).

References

Populated places in Primorje-Gorski Kotar County